Haunted is a 1995 horror film, by veteran director Lewis Gilbert and starring Aidan Quinn, Kate Beckinsale, Anthony Andrews, Victoria Shalet and John Gielgud. It is based on a 1988 novel of the same name by James Herbert, but makes significant changes to the original story. The film was produced by Andrews and Gilbert.

Plot
In 1928 England, David Ash (Aidan Quinn), an American professor, has spent a majority of his life working in the field of parapsychology to disprove the existence of ghosts. He was motivated by the untimely death of his twin sister, Juliet, for which he blames himself. As a professor at Oxford, he receives a series of urgent entreaties from a Ms. Webb, who claims she is being tormented by ghosts, to come and help her. David travels to Sussex, where he is picked up at the railway station by the beautiful Christina Mariell (Kate Beckinsale). Christina explains that Ms. Webb is in fact their Nanny Tess (Anna Massey), and that she wrote to David at the urging of the Mariell siblings, Christina, Robert and Simon. The siblings are concerned for her mental health and believe her belief in ghosts is due to her senility. She drives David to the palatial Edbrook House, where he meets Christina's two brothers and the withdrawn Nanny Tess.

David begins to perform forensic examinations of the house, trying to detect evidence of paranormal activity. Complicating the investigation is Christina's continuous flirtation with David, and his own infatuation with her. However, older brother Robert (Anthony Andrews) is adamantly against their friendship and the two have a suspiciously close relationship. David himself begins having paranormal experiences. Christina, who had originally told David both her parents died in India, admits that in fact her mother drowned herself in the lake and Nanny Tess was the one who discovered the body. David postulates that it is the trauma of this which is causing Nanny Tess to see the ghost of Mrs. Mariell.

When David decides to finally leave Edbrook, he asks Christina to come away with him. Although she refuses, they engage in a passionate kiss and end up in making love in her bed. In the morning when David wakes, the wind is gusting through the house, which is now cloaked in black drapes and littered with fallen leaves. He searches for Christina but instead sees the ghost of his twin sister Juliet, who leads David to a cemetery. Juliet calls his attention to a specific tombstone which states that Robert, Christina and Simon Mariell all died in a fire at Edbrook House in 1923.

A very confused David seeks out Dr. Doyle (John Gielgud), the family doctor, only to be told by his sister's ghost that Doyle also had died many years ago. Despite his sister's warning, David leaves with Christina, who has appeared in her car. On the drive home, he sees the vision of his sister in the middle of the road and wrenches the wheel to avoid her. The car crashes into a tree and explodes, killing Christina. David escapes, returns to the house, and confronts Nanny Tess. She confirms that the Mariell siblings are indeed dead and that their ghosts will do anything to keep Nanny Tess and David from leaving. Nanny Tess also reveals that the reason Mrs. Mariell drowned herself was because she discovered drunken Simon and Robert in their parent's bed having incestuous sex with Christina. The siblings appear and force Nanny Tess to confess to their murder (she had locked the siblings in a bedroom and then set fire to the house).

Robert reveals that, with David as the new victim of their torments, they no longer need Nanny Tess. They kill Nanny Tess, and Christina asks David to die for them. He tries to escape, but is blocked by the three siblings and Dr. Doyle. They set the mansion ablaze, but he escapes to the upstairs bedroom. While Robert, Simon and Christina cackle mockingly within the flames at his imminent death, Juliet suddenly appears and walks through the flames, takes David by the hand and rescues him from the inferno. As they walk away from the mansion's ruins, Juliet absolves him of his guilt over her death and departs to the afterlife.

After the harrowing experience, David returns home and is greeted by his assistant, Kate, as he steps off the train. A few steps behind the unsuspecting couple, Christina steps out of the shadows and follows them through the fog as they leave the platform.

Production
Haunted was shot on location in Parham Park and Parham House, West Sussex, England.

Cast

Aidan Quinn as Professor David Ash
Peter England as Young David Ash 12
Kate Beckinsale as Christina Mariell 20
Anthony Andrews as Robert Mariell 30
John Gielgud as Dr. Doyle
Anna Massey as Nanny Tessa Webb
Alex Lowe as Simon Mariell 26
Victoria Shalet as Young Juliet Ash 12
Geraldine Somerville as Kate McCarrick
Linda Bassett as Madam Brontski
Liz Smith as Old Gypsy Woman
Alice Douglas as Clare
Edmund Moriarty as Liam
Emily Hamilton as Mary
Tom Lipscombe as School Boy

Reception

The film received an 80% fresh rating from five critics on Rotten Tomatoes.

See also
List of ghost films

References

External links
 
 

1995 films
1995 horror films
1995 drama films
1990s ghost films
1990s mystery films
British ghost films
British horror drama films
British mystery films
Films about siblings
Films based on British novels
Films directed by Lewis Gilbert
Films set in 1928
Gothic horror films
British haunted house films
Mystery horror films
Incest in film
Films set in country houses
Films set in Sussex
Films shot in West Sussex
1990s English-language films
1990s British films